Agymnastus is a genus of band-winged grasshoppers in the family Acrididae. There are at least 2 described species in Agymnastus.

Species
 Agymnastus ingens (Scudder, 1877) (lubberly band-winged grasshopper)
 Agymnastus venerabilis Rentz, 1978

References

Further reading

 
 

Oedipodinae